Hovhannes Tumanyan (classical spelling: Յովհաննէս Թումանեան,  – March 23, 1923) was an Armenian poet, writer, translator, and literary and public activist. He is the national poet of Armenia.

Tumanyan wrote poems, quatrains, ballads, novels, fables, and critical and journalistic articles. His work was mostly written in realistic form, that frequently revolves around everyday life of his time. Born in the historical village of Dsegh in the Lori region, at a young age Tumanyan moved to Tiflis, which was the centre of Armenian culture under the Russian Empire during the 19th and early 20th centuries. He soon became known to the wide Armenian society for his simple but very poetic works.

Many films and animated films have been adapted from Tumanyan's works. Two operas, Anush (1912) by Armen Tigranian and Almast (1930) by Alexander Spendiaryan, were written based on his works.

Biography

Hovhannes Tumanyan was born on February 19, 1869, in the village of Dsegh, Tiflis Governorate, Russian Empire (now in Lori Province, Armenia).

His father, Aslan (1839–1898), was the village priest known as Ter-Tadevos. He was an offspring of an Armenian princely family of Tumanyan, branch of the famous royal house of Mamikonian that settled in Lori in 10th and 11th centuries from their original feudal fief of Taron.

His mother, Sona (1842–1936), was an avid storyteller with a particular interest in fables. Young Tumanyan was the oldest of eight children; his siblings were Rostom (1871–1915), Osan (1874–1926), Iskuhi (1878–1943), Vahan (1881–1937), Astghik (1885–1953), Arshavir (1888–1921), Artashes (1892–1916).

From 1877 to 1879, Tumanyan attended the parochial school of Dsegh. From 1879 to 1883 he went to a school in Jalaloghly. Tumanyan moved to Tiflis in 1883, where he attended the Nersisyan School from 1883 to 1887. Tumanyan's wrote his first poem at the age of 12, while studying in Jalaloghly school. He lived at the teacher's house for a while and fell in love with the teacher's daughter Vergine. Since 1893, Tumanyan worked for Aghbyur, Murtch, Hasker and Horizon periodicals and also was engaged in public activism.

In 1899, Tumanyan came up with an idea of organizing meetings of Armenian intellectuals of the time at his house on 44 Bebutov Street in Tiflis (present-day Amaghleba 18, in Sololaki).  Soon it became an influential literary group, which often gathered in the garret of Tumanyan's house. Vernatun means garret in Armenian, which was the name the group was referred to. Prominent members of the collective were Avetik Isahakyan, Derenik Demirchyan, Levon Shant, Ghazaros Aghayan, Perch Proshyan, Nikol Aghbalian, Alexander Shirvanzade, Nar-Dos, Vrtanes Papazyan, Vahan Terian, Leo, Stepan Lisitsyan, Mariam Tumanyan, Gevorg Bashinjagyan and many other significant Armenian figures of early 20th century. With some pauses, it existed until 1908.

In 1912 Tumanyan was elected the president of the Company of Caucasus Armenian Writers.

In the fall of 1921, Tumanyan went to Constantinople to find support of Armenian refugees. After months spent there, he returned ill. After surgery in 1922, he started to get better. But in September, Tumanyan's disease started to progress again. He was transferred to a hospital in Moscow, where he died on March 23, 1923.

Personal life
In 1888, at the age of 19, Hovhannes Tumanyan married Olga Matchkalyan, age 17. They had 10 children: Musegh (1889–1938), Ashkhen (1891–1968), Nvard (1892–1957), Artavazd (1894–1918), Hamlik (1896–1937), Anush (1898–1927), Arpik (1899–1981), Areg (1900–1939), Seda (1905–1988), Tamar (1907–1989).

Political and public activism
During the government-provoked Armenian–Tatar massacres of 1905–1907, Tumanyan took the role of a peacemaker, for which he was arrested twice. Tumanyan also deeply criticized the Georgian–Armenian War of 1918. Tumanyan was also actively engaged in preaching the Gospel. As he put in one of his verses, "There is only one way of salvation; through Jesus Christ abiding inside every one of us".

In October 1914 Tumanyan joined the "Committee for Support of War Victims", which later helped Armenian Genocide refugees settled in Etchmiadzin.

In 1921 in Tiflis he founded the House of Armenian Art.

Literary work

Tumanyan's work is simple, natural and poetically inspired at the same time. It is not by mere chance that dozens of phrases and expressions from Tumanyan's works have become a natural part of people's everyday language, their sayings, adages, and maxims.

Tumanyan is usually regarded in Armenian circles as "All-Armenian poet".  He earned this title when the Catholicos of Armenia had ordered that Armenian refugees from the west not enter certain areas of his church and house, since he is considered to be "The Catholicos of all Armenians".  Tumanyan in response decried that decision claiming that the refugees could seek relief in the Catholicos' quarters under order of "The Poet of all Armenians".

He created lyrics, fables, epic poems and translations into Armenian of Byron, Goethe and Pushkin.

Tumanyan's most famous works include:

Ballads and poems
 The Dog and the Cat (1886)
 Maro (1887)
 Akhtamar (1891)
 David of Sassoun (1902)
 The Capture of Fort Tmuk (1902)
 A Drop of Honey (1909)
 The End of Evil (1908)
 The Shah and the Peddler (1917)

Novels
 Anush (1890)
 Gikor
 David of Sassoun

Fairy tales
 Nazar the Brave
 The Kid Goat
 The Unlucky Panos

Legacy

Translations
Tumanyan's works were translated by Valeri Bryusov, Konstantin Balmont, Joseph Brodsky, Samuil Marshak, Bella Akhmadulina and others.

Places named after Tumanyan
In Armenia:
 Tumanyan's native village of Dsegh was renamed Tumanyan in his honor in 1938, before being changed back to Dsegh in 1969.
 Tumanyan City in Lori Province, which until 1951 was named Dzaghidzor.
 Pedagogical University of Vanadzor
 Armenian State Puppet Theater in Yerevan
 Tumanyan St. in central Yerevan
 Tumanyan Park in Yerevan's Ajapnyak district

Outside of Armenia:
 Tumanyan Square (Площадь Туманяна) – in Northern Administrative Okrug of Moscow, Russia.
 Tumanyan Streets in Kiev, Tbilisi, Donetsk, Sochi, khutor Shaumyanovsky in Rostov Oblast.

There are 2 museums of Tumanyan in Armenia, one in his birthplace Dsegh and another one in Yerevan. Tumanyan's museum in Yerevan was opened in 1953.

In Autumn of 2011 the government of Armenia purchased a flat that Tumanyan had lived in in Tbilisi from its Georgian owner and in 2017 opened it as a museum and cultural center.

In popular culture

Opera
 Anoush (1912) by Armen Tigranian, based on Anush novel (1902)
 Almast (1930) by Alexander Spendiaryan, based on The Capture of Tmkabert (1902)

The following films were adapted from Hovhannes Tumanyan's works.

Films
Films based on works of Tumanyan:
 Gikor by A. Martirosyan; silent (1934)
 The Master and the Servant by D. Keosayan; Armenfilm (1962)
 Akhtamar by E. Martirosyan; Armenfilm (1969)
 Honor of the Poor by B. Hovhannisyan, A. Samvelyan; Armenfilm (1969)
 The Fat King by D. Keosayan; Armenfilm (1969)
 The Lying Hunter by Aramayis Sargsyan; Armenfilm (1969)
 Since the Time of Hunger by E. Martirosyan; Armenfilm (1974)
 Gikor by S. Israeilyan; Armenfilm (1982)
 A Drop of Honey by Henrik Malyan; in Russian; Armenfilm (1982)

Animated films
Cartoons based on works of Tumanyan:
 A Drop of Honey by V. Podpomogov (1968)
 Parvana by V. Podpomogov (1968)
 Hunter the Liar by E. Badalyan (1969)
 The Unlucky Panos by S. Galstuyan (1980)
 The Death of Kikos by Robert Sahakyants (1979)
 Nazar the Brave by Robert Sahakyants (1986)
 ‘’ Wow, a speaking Fish!’’ by (Robert Shakahyants) (1983)

Postage stamps, banknotes and coins

Collections in Armenian
 The Complete Works, Vol I-X, Yerevan, 1988-1999

See also

 Armenian literature
 Armenians in Georgia
 Armenians in Tbilisi

References

Further reading
 Hayrapetyan, Tamar. "ՀԱՅ ԺՈՂՈՎՐԴԱԿԱՆ ՀԵՔԻԱԹՆԵՐԻ ԹՈՒՄԱՆՅԱՆԱԿԱՆ ՄՇԱԿՄԱՆ ՄԻՋԱԶԳԱՅԻՆ ԶՈՒԳԱՀԵՌՆԵՐԸ" [INTERNATIONAL PARALLELS OF TOUMANIAN’S TRANSLATIONS OF ARMENIAN FOLKTALES]. In: ՈՍԿԵ ԴԻՎԱՆ – Հեքիաթագիտական հանդես [Voske Divan – Journal of fairy-tale studies]. 6, 2019, pp. 67–78. (In Armenian)
 Vardanyan, Nvard. "«ԿԱՐՄԻՐ ԾԱՂԻԿԸ» ԵՎ «ԵԴԵՄԱԿԱՆ ԾԱՂԻԿԸ»ՀԵՔԻԱԹՆԵՐԻ ՀԵՏՔԵՐՈՎ" [ON TWO FAIRY TALES THE “RED FLOWER” AND THE “EDEN FLOWER”]. In: ՈՍԿԵ ԴԻՎԱՆ – Հեքիաթագիտական հանդես [Voske Divan – Journal of fairy-tale studies]. 6, 2019, pp. 88–96. (In Armenian)

External links

 Hovhannes Tumanyan's fairy tales at Wikisource (in Armenian)
 Tumanyan Museum
 About Museum of Hovhannes Tumanyan
  Many of his stories
 Translated works
 Full collection of Hovhannes Tumanyan's works in Armenian at EANC e-library
 Works of Hovhannes Tumanyan at the Armenian Wikisource
 

 
1869 births
1923 deaths
19th-century Armenian poets
Writers from Tbilisi
Armenian Christians
Burials at Armenian Pantheon of Tbilisi
20th-century Armenian poets
Armenian male poets